Sphex dorsalis is a species of thread-waisted wasp in the family Sphecidae. It is found from the southern United States south to Mexico, Central America, and South America.

References

Further reading

 
 
 

Sphecidae
Insects described in 1845